Žan Rogelj (born 25 November 1999) is a Slovenian professional footballer who plays for WSG Tirol and the Slovenia national team.

Club career
Rogelj started the 2018–19 season as a reserve player for the Slovenian top flight side Triglav Kranj but ended the season as a starter, making 22 league appearances.

In August 2020, he signed for WSG Tirol in the Austrian Bundesliga.

International career
Rogelj debuted with the senior Slovenia national team in a friendly 6–0 win over Gibraltar on 4 June 2021.

References

External links
 
 Žan Rogelj at NZS 

1999 births
Living people
Sportspeople from Kranj
Slovenian footballers
Association football fullbacks
Association football midfielders
Slovenia youth international footballers
Slovenia under-21 international footballers
Slovenia international footballers
NK Triglav Kranj players
WSG Tirol players
Slovenian PrvaLiga players
Slovenian Second League players
Austrian Football Bundesliga players
Slovenian expatriate footballers
Slovenian expatriate sportspeople in Austria
Expatriate footballers in Austria